Ultimate Beverage Challenge, established in 2009, conducts an annual spirit competition, Ultimate Spirits Challenge. 
The entries for this competition are submitted on a global basis.

Ultimate Spirits Challenge, first launched in 2010, is held on annual basis. The awards and recognition given in the competition include Chairman's Trophy, Finalist, and Great Value Award. Ultimate Spirits Challenge also publishes its annual Top 100 list from each year's judging.

History
Ultimate Beverage Challenge was founded in 2009 by F. Paul Pacult, David Talbot, and Sue Woodley. It was first held in 2010, and it has been held on an annual basis since then. It is based in New York, United States.

In 2012, Financial Times called Ultimate Wine Challenge a "highly selective" challenge.

In 2021, the competition received entries from 52 countries.

Competitions
 Ultimate Spirits Challenge
 Ultimate Wine Challenge (no longer awarded)

Products judged
All categories of spirits, plus aperitifs; vermouths; fortified wines such as port and sherry; Ready-to-Drink and pre-mixed cocktails; non-alcoholic mixers; non-alcoholic drinks; hard seltzers, sample bottles not yet in their finished packaging or with final label and products that do not have a US importer or distributor.

Recipients

Chairman's Trophy
 Slovenia Vodka (2013)
 Blended Irish Whiskey (2014)
 Remus Repeal Reserve (2018)
 Ardbeg Uigedail Islay Single Malt Scotch Whisky
 Cointreau l'Unique
 Plantation 3 Stars White Rum
 Gordon’s Travelers' Edition London Dry Gin

Great Value Award
 Mezzacorona
 Heaven Hill Bottled-in-Bond 7 years Old Kentucky Straight Bourbon
 Jameson Black Barrel Irish Blended Whiskey 
 Appleton Estate Signature Rum 
 Fords London Dry Gin

Judging process
The judging process is based upon blind tasting in small flights, with entries evaluated by multiple panels over an extended period of time. Judges are expert tasters who are highly regarded in their field. All judging takes place in Ultimate Beverage Challenge's own tasting facility, specifically designed to optimize the evaluation process. All products are scored on the 100-point scale. Detailed tasting notes are provided for all products scoring 85 points and higher.

Awards
 Chairman's Trophy Award
 Finalist
 Great Value
 Top 100 Spirits

Notable judges
 F. Paul Pacult
 Dale DeGroff
 Meaghan Dorman
 Will Shine
 Charlotte Voisey

References

Wine awards